Palestine is an 1803 romantic long poem by noted clergyman Reginald Heber,  successfully entered  for the Newdigate Prize.

Background
Heber had been helped in this composition by Sir Walter Scott, a family friend, before the future novelist's years of fame. They'd had a discussion over breakfast about Palestine, and he began writing it before he left the table. When Heber declaimed the poem at that year's Encaenia ceremony at the Sheldonian Theatre, it was given an enthusiastic reception. The poem was later published, and in 1812 was set to music by the composer William Crotch as an oratorio. Crotch had been professor of music at Oxford since 1797.

Reception

Montefiore, writing in 1902, described the poem as "the most successful and popular piece of religious verse of the first half of the [19th] century". A later biographer, Derrick Hughes, finds its contemporary acclaim puzzling: "It is not a good, not even a mediocre poem; it is leaden". In the United States it was published as Palestine and other poems, and also included memoirs of Heber's life.

References

External links
View at archive.org

1803 poems